Los Shakers is the first studio album by Uruguayan rock band Los Shakers. It was released in July 1965 on the Odeon Pops label.

Track list

Personnel
 Hugo Fattoruso - lead vocals, lead guitar, organ, celeste, harmonica, hand-claps
 Osvaldo Fattoruso - backing vocals, rhythm guitar, hand-claps, shared lead vocals on "Que Amor (What A Love)" and "My Bonnie"
 Roberto "Pelín" Capobianco - backing vocals, bass guitar, hand-claps
 Carlos "Caio" Vila - backing vocals, drums, percussion, hand-claps

References

External links

1965 debut albums
Los Shakers albums